Ian "Gianni" Cassaro Usart (born 10 April 1992) is a Spanish footballer who plays as a goalkeeper for Villarreal CF B.

Club career
Cassaro was born in Lloret de Mar, Girona, Catalonia to an Italian father, and made his senior debut with hometown side CF Lloret in Primera Catalana in 2011. On 5 August 2014, he moved straight to Segunda División B after signing for UE Olot, but spent the campaign as a backup option.

On 19 June 2015, Cassaro was loaned to Tercera División side CE Europa, for one year. On 22 July 2016, he moved to Girona FC, being a third-choice of the main squad while playing for farm team CF Peralada in the third division.

On 1 June 2018, Cassaro agreed to a deal with CF Talavera de la Reina, still in the third division. On 26 June of the following year, after being a regular starter, he moved to fellow league team UCAM Murcia CF, but was only a second-choice behind Julio Iricibar.

On 20 August 2020, Cassaro signed for Yeclano Deportivo also in the division three, being an undisputed starter as his side suffered relegation. On 25 August 2021, he joined Villarreal CF's reserves in Primera Federación; an initial third-choice option to Iker Álvarez and Filip Jörgensen, he contributed with seven appearances during the campaign as his side achieved promotion to Segunda División.

On 22 June 2022, Cassaro renewed his contract with the Yellow Submarine for a further year. He made his professional debut at the age of 30 on 17 September, starting in a 3–1 home win over CD Lugo.

References

External links

1992 births
Living people
People from Selva
Spanish footballers
Footballers from Catalonia
Association football goalkeepers
Segunda División players
Primera Federación players
Segunda División B players
Tercera División players
Primera Catalana players
UE Olot players
CE Europa footballers
CF Peralada players
CF Talavera de la Reina players
UCAM Murcia CF players
Yeclano Deportivo players
Villarreal CF B players